The Yamanote Line (Yamanote-sen) is a loop service in Tokyo, Japan, operated by the East Japan Railway Company (JR East). It is one of Tokyo's busiest and most important lines, connecting most of Tokyo's major stations and urban centres, including Marunouchi, the Yūrakuchō/Ginza area, Shinagawa, Shibuya, Shinjuku, Ikebukuro, and Ueno, with all but two of its 30 stations connecting to other railway or underground (subway) lines.

Internally JR East refers to the "Yamanote Line" as the quadruple-track  corridor between Shinagawa and Tabata via Shinjuku. The corridor consists of a pair of tracks used by Yamanote local trains and another parallel pair of tracks called "the Yamanote Freight Line" used by the Saikyō and Shōnan-Shinjuku line trains, some limited express services, and freight trains. In everyday usage, branding on maps and station signage, the "Yamanote Line" refers to the local service running the entire  line looping between the Yamanote corridor via Shinjuku Station and the central portions of the Tōhoku and Tōkaidō Main Lines Via Tokyo Station. (This article uses the same definition unless noted otherwise.)

Service outline

Trains run from 04:26 to 01:04 the next day at intervals as short as 2 minutes during peak periods and four minutes at other times. A complete loop takes 59 to 65 minutes. All trains stop at each station. (Trains travel on the left in Japan, as with road traffic.)

The line also acts as a fare zone destination for JR tickets from locations outside Tokyo, permitting travel to any JR station on or within the loop.

Ridership and overcrowding 
Due to the Yamanote Line's central location connecting most of Tokyo's major commuter hubs and commercial areas, the line is very heavily used. Sections of the line were running over 250% capacity in the 1990s, remained above 200% for most of the 2000s with most sections dropping below 150% in 2018. This is due to larger and more frequent trains being introduced to the Yamanote Line and the opening of parallel relief lines such as the Tokyo Metro  and Ueno–Tokyo Line. The maximum overcrowding during rush hour is about 158%.

The ridership intensity of the Yamanote Line in 2018 was 1,134,963 passengers - km / km of route. The daily ridership of the Yamanote Line estimated in a 2015 MLIT National Transit census was about 4 million people per day. However, in both cases "Yamanote Line" refers to JR East's internal definition of the entire rail corridor between Shinagawa and Tabata stations via Shinjuku which includes the ridership of the Saikyō and Shōnan–Shinjuku Lines on the parallel Yamanote freight line. Meanwhile, the ridership of the Yamanote Line services between Tabata and Shinagawa Station via Tokyo are excluded and counted as part of the Tōhoku and Tōkaidō Main Lines.

Name 

"Yamanote" literally refers to inland, hillier districts or foothills (as distinct from areas close to the sea). In Tokyo, "Yamanote" lies along the western side of the Yamanote Line loop. The word consists of the Japanese morphemes yama, meaning 'mountain', the genitive suffix no, and te, meaning 'hand', thus literally translating as "mountain's hand", analogous to the English term "foothills".

Yamanote-sen is officially written in Japanese without the kana , which makes its pronunciation ambiguous in print. The characters  may also be pronounced yamate, as in Yamate-dōri (Yamate Street), which runs parallel to the west side of the Yamanote Line. The Seishin-Yamate Line in Kobe and the Yamate area of Yokohama also use this pronunciation.

After World War II, SCAP ordered all train placards to be romanized, and the Yamanote Line was romanized as "Yamate Line". It was thus alternatively known as "Yamanote" and "Yamate" until 1971, when the Japanese National Railways changed the pronunciation back to "Yamanote". Some older people still refer to the line as the "Yamate Line".

Station list 
 Stations are listed in clockwise order from Shinagawa to Tabata, but for operational purposes trains officially start and terminate at Ōsaki.
 : Shinagawa → Shibuya → Shinjuku → Ikebukuro → Tabata → Ueno → Tokyo → Shinagawa
 : Shinagawa → Tokyo → Ueno → Tabata → Ikebukuro → Shinjuku → Shibuya → Shinagawa
 All stations are located in the special wards of Tokyo.
 All trains on the Yamanote Line are local trains that stop at all stations.

Legend

 ● : Trains stop
 ｜ : Trains pass
 ▲ : Keihin–Tōhoku Rapid trains stop only on weekends or holidays
 ▼ : Some Shōnan–Shinjuku trains stop

Rolling stock

, the line's services are operated exclusively by a fleet of 50 11-car E235 series EMUs, the first of which was introduced on the line on 30 November 2015. However, a number of technical faults, including problems with door close indicators, resulted in the train being taken out of service the same day. The E235 series returned to service on the Yamanote Line on 7 March 2016.

Former rolling stock

Prior to the E235 series, the line's services were operated by E231-500 series EMUs, which were in use from April 21, 2002 to January 20, 2020. These trains originally each included two "six-door cars" with six pairs of doors per side and bench seats that were folded up to provide standing room only during the morning peak until 10 a.m. From February 22, 2010, the seats were no longer folded up during the morning peak, and all trains were standardized with newly built four-door cars by 31 August 2011. This was due to reduced congestion on the line as well as preparation for the installation of platform doors on all stations by 2017.

The E231 series supported a new type of traffic control system, called digital Automatic Train Control (D-ATC). The series also had a more modern design and has two 15-inch LCD monitors above each door, one of which is used for displaying silent commercials, news and weather; and another which is used for displaying information on the next stop (in Japanese, English, Korean and more) along with notification of delays on Shinkansen and other railway lines in the greater Tokyo area. The E231-500 series trains were based at Tokyo General Rolling Stock Centre near Ōsaki Station.

 DeHo 6100 series (from 1909 until unknown date)
 MoHa 10
 63 series
 72 series
 101 series ("Canary" yellow livery, from September 1961 until circa 1968)
 103 series ("Uguisu" green livery, from December 1963 until June 26, 1988)
 205 series (from March 25, 1985 until April 17, 2005)
 E231-500 series (from April 21, 2002 until January 20, 2020)

Timeline

History

The predecessor of the present-day Yamanote Line was opened on 1 March 1885 by the Nippon Railway Company, operating between Shinagawa Station in the south and Akabane Station in the north.

The line was electrified on December 16, 1909, soon after the Osaki – Shinagawa section was double-tracked on November 30. A parallel freight line, also completed in 1925, ran along the inner side of the loop between Shinagawa and Tabata.

During the prewar era, the Ministry of Railways did not issue permits to private suburban railway companies for new lines to cross the Yamanote Line from their terminal stations to the central districts of Tokyo, forcing the companies to terminate services at stations on the line.

However, Yamanote Line trains continued to periodically use the Keihin-Tōhoku tracks, particularly on holidays and during off-peak hours, until rapid service trains were introduced on the Keihin-Tōhoku Line in 1988.

A major explosion on the Yamanote Freight Line in Shinjuku in 1967 led to the diversion of freight traffic to the more distant Musashino Line. To address severe undercapacity, the freight line was repurposed for use by Saikyō Line and Shōnan-Shinjuku Line trains, as well as certain limited express trains such as the Narita Express and some liner services. Likewise, from 14 March 2015 onwards, the Ueno-Tokyo Line starts services, which connects the Tōhoku Main Line and Jōban Line to the Tōkaidō Main Line, to provide further relief on the busiest portion of the Yamanote Line today, the segment between Ueno and Tokyo stations.

Automatic train control (ATC) was introduced from 6 December 1981, and digital ATC (D-ATC) was introduced from 30 July 2006.

Station numbering was introduced on JR East stations in the Tokyo area from 20 August 2016, with Yamanote Line stations numbered using the prefix "JY".

A new station, Takanawa Gateway Station, opened on 14 March 2020. This station was built on the Yamanote Line and Keihin-Tohoku Line between Shinagawa and Tamachi stations, becoming the first new station on the line since Nishi-Nippori was built in 1971. The new station was constructed on top of the 20-hectare former railyard, which is undergoing rationalization and redevelopment by JR East; it is roughly parallel to the existing Sengakuji Station on the Toei Asakusa and Keikyu Main lines. The Yamanote Line and the Keihin-Tohoku Line tracks were moved slightly to the east to be aligned closer to the Tokaido Shinkansen tracks. The area on the west side of the yard made available will be redeveloped with high-rise office buildings, creating an international business center with good connections to the Shinkansen and Haneda Airport.

In October 2022 JR East began performing trial runs for driverless trains on the line aimed to begin sometime in 2028. Two sets, 17 and 18, were fitted with the new system and re-entered service on the line as train crew conduct ongoing tests on their performance. Furthermore, the two sets are easy to distinguish with an “ATO” (Automatic Train Operation) sticker located on the front and sides of each set. Once ATO is fully installed, this will be the first line of JR East to feature driverless trains.

See also

 Osaka Loop Line, a similar loop line serving Central Osaka.
 Musashino Line, a line regarded by JR East as part of the Tokyo Mega Loop.

Notes

a. Crowding levels defined by the Ministry of Land, Infrastructure, Transport and Tourism:

100% — Commuters have enough personal space and are able to take a seat or stand while holding onto the straps or hand rails.
150% — Commuters have enough personal space to read a newspaper.
180% — Commuters must fold newspapers to read.
200% — Commuters are pressed against each other in each compartment but can still read small magazines.
250% — Commuters are pressed against each other, unable to move.

b. Ridership of the section between Shinagawa-Tabata (via Shinjuku) including ridership from the Saikyō and Shōnan-Shinjuku services operating through this section. Ridership in the report estimated from OD surveys and commuter pass data.  「平均通過人員」or average passenger intensity is defined by JR East as Annual passenger-kilometre / route length / number of workdays per year.

References

Further reading

External links

 Stations of the Yamanote Line (JR East) 

 
Lines of East Japan Railway Company
Railway lines in Tokyo
Railway loop lines
1067 mm gauge railways in Japan
Railway lines opened in 1885
Articles containing video clips
1885 establishments in Japan
1500 V DC railway electrification